North Sydney (Scottish Gaelic: Suidni A Tuath or Am Bàr) is a former town and current community in Nova Scotia's Cape Breton Regional Municipality.

Located on the north side of Sydney Harbour, along the eastern coast of Cape Breton Island, North Sydney is an important port in Atlantic Canada, serving as the western terminus of the Marine Atlantic ferry service. It acts as the marine link for the Trans-Canada Highway to Newfoundland and is often termed "The Gateway To Newfoundland" for that reason.

Marine Atlantic ferries currently operate from North Sydney's terminal to the ports of Channel-Port aux Basques and Argentia. The Crown Corporation is one of the largest employers in the area.

History

North Sydney was settled around 1785 by European and Loyalist settlers. It emerged as a major shipbuilding centre in the early 19th century, building many brigs and brigantines for the English market, later moving on to larger barques, and in 1851 to the full-rigged Lord Clarendon, the largest wooden ship ever built in Cape Breton. Wooden shipbuilding declined in the 1860s, but the same decade saw the arrival of increasing numbers of steamships, drawn to North Sydney for bunker coal. By 1870 it was the fourth largest port in Canada dealing in ocean-going vessels, in part because the Western Union cable office had been established here in 1875. The community was incorporated on 24 April 1885 as a town within Cape Breton County. The railway came to Cape Breton Island in 1891. At this time there were 2,513 people in North Sydney, as compared to 2,417 in Sydney.

In 1898 North Sydney was chosen by the Reid-Newfoundland Company as the Canadian mainland terminal for a ferry service to Newfoundland; in June of that year the SS Bruce sailed from Port Aux Basques as the first ship to make that run.

World wars
During the First and Second World Wars, North Sydney played an important role in the relay of information from Europe to both Ottawa and Washington, D.C. Its Western Union Cable office was where coded messages arrived from overseas, and were then relayed on to the rest of North America.

On the morning of November 10, 1918, the office received a top-secret coded message from Europe stating that effective at 11 am on the next day (November 11, 1918), all fighting would cease on land, sea and in the air. This meant that the people of North Sydney, in particular Mrs. Annie Butler Smith, were the first to know of the end of the Great War. It is reported that on the night on November 10, 1918, over 200 servicemen marched through the streets of the town to celebrate the end of the war, one day before the rest of the world knew.

United States Navy
During the Great War, the United States Navy operated an air base in North Sydney. The base was primarily used as a landing/launching area for seaplanes. Known as NAS North Sydney the base was originally located at Indian Beach while more permanent facilities were built at nearby Kelly's Beach (now called Munro Park). The base was given the Naval postal address of "139 FPO New York" and the signal code "ALML". In command was Lt. Robert Donahue of the U.S. Coast Guard who operated under the direction of U.S. Navy Lt. Richard E. Byrd who was based in Halifax. The Kelly's Beach base closed in early 1919 but was reactivated by the Royal Canadian Air Force during World War II.

German U Boats
During the Second World War, on the night of October 13, 1942, the SS Caribou (a passenger ferry) left North Sydney harbour for Port aux Basques with 237 on board. At 3:40 am on the morning of October 14, the Caribou was hit by a single torpedo on her starboard side; 136 people perished.

Filmography

Although North Sydney does not have a very developed arts community, it has served as the backdrop for at least five movies.

In 1995, scenes for Margaret's Museum were filmed in the town. Most were shot on King Street, where a house was used as a mine manager's house. In 1999, two films were shot in North Sydney. First, was New Waterford Girl. Downtown North Sydney was used to represent downtown New Waterford in the 1970s.

The other film from this year was a CBC made-for-TV movie named Win Again, starring Gordon Pinsent. This time, North Sydney posed as a small town in Newfoundland. The closing scene of the movie has a nice shot of the whole town, taken from a large crane from the downtown area.

Northside General Hospital
Northside General Hospital, in North Sydney, is the only public hospital to cover health care on the entire north side area of Cape Breton. It has five floors, not including the ground floor. The hospital does not perform any major surgery. Although it does have an emergency room, this has scheduled closures, during which residents must go to the Cape Breton Regional Hospital in Sydney. The Harbourview Veterans Hospital located in nearby Sydney Mines is a continuing-care rehabilitation facility. It has a ward for physio and hearing and speech, but no outpatients or emergency wards.

Schools
There is one elementary school: Ferrisview Elementary. There was a complex of Saint Joseph's Elementary and Saint Mary's Elementary, but this complex was demolished in March 2008 to make way for a new multimillion-dollar school, Ferrisview Elementary. Seton Elementary was shut down in 2019 and given to the local food bank. Thompson Middle School was the only middle school in North Sydney before its demolition in 2018, after the school's closing, students started attending Sydney Mines Middle School. There is no high school in North Sydney and as a result, all students attend Memorial Composite High School, in the neighbouring town of Sydney Mines, which is the only high school for the entire Northside area.

Cape Breton County Farmers
North Sydney is home to the Cape Breton County Farmer's Exhibition. Held every August by the Cape Breton Federation of Agriculture, it is possibly the largest tourist attraction in the town. People from all over Industrial Cape Breton attend the event, and exhibitors come from all over the Atlantic Provinces. The main attraction is the agricultural and cultural displays. The Exhibition also includes a circus midway and horse riding presentations such as barrel racing, skills competitions, and draft horse competitions as well as two competitions that have made a comeback after many years of not being featured, the oxen pull revived in 2012 and the cattle (beef and dairy) being revived in 2011.

Started in 1916, the exhibition was originally based in Sydney and a few years later relocated to its present location at the top of Regent Street.

Notable people
Paul Andrea, retired NHL hockey player
Flash Hollett, retired NHL hockey player
Flora MacDonald, former federal cabinet minister
Arthur B. McDonald, Nobel laureate in the field of physics
Cat Power (aka Haley Rogers), professional wrestler
Harold Russell, Academy Award–winning actor
Bobby Smith, retired NHL hockey player
Clifford Shaw Thompson, 15th Canadian Surgeon General

Notable connections
Academy Award winning actors and siblings Warren Beatty and Shirley MacLaine were born to drama teacher Kathlyn Corinne who was born in North Sydney.

References

External links
Official site

Communities in the Cape Breton Regional Municipality
Former towns in Nova Scotia
Populated places disestablished in 1995
Populated coastal places in Canada